A Christ figure, also known as a Christ-Image is a literary technique that the author uses to draw allusions between their characters and the biblical Jesus. More loosely, the Christ figure is a spiritual or prophetic character who parallels Jesus, or other spiritual or prophetic figures.

In general, a character should display more than one correspondence with the story of Jesus Christ as depicted in the Bible. For instance, the character might display one or more of the following traits: performance of miracles, manifestation of divine qualities, healing others, displaying kindness and forgiveness, fighting for justice, being guided by the spirit of the father character, and the character's own death and resurrection. Christ figures are often martyrs, sacrificing themselves for larger causes.

In postmodern literature, the resurrection theme is often abandoned, leaving us with the image of a martyr sacrificing himself for a greater good. It is common to see Christ figures displayed in a manner suggestive of crucifixion as well.

Literature

Jim Conklin in The Red Badge of Courage. R.W. Stallman has first put forward the hypothesis; however, it has led to a long-lasting and controversial debate among Crane scholars. 
Sydney Carton in A Tale of Two Cities
Alyosha Karamazov in The Brothers Karamazov
 Uncle Tom and Eva St. Clare in Uncle Tom's Cabin
 Jim Casy in The Grapes of Wrath can be seen as taking on the role of both Jesus and Moses starting in the beginning of the novel where, after taking a break from being a preacher, returns to offer a new and important view of the lives the Okies live. Before his break it is important to note that the preacher is referred to as a burning bush. He then embarks on a journey with the 12 members of the Joad family which can also be seen as the apostles. Then when the Joads and the preacher arrive at a hoovile they come into an argument with a police officer and Tom lands a punch in. Then Jim Casy takes the blame for Tom and winds up in jail. Later, Jim Casy appears when the Joads are working at a peach farm. We learn that Jim Casy is trying to create a workers union, and he tries to convince Tom to get others to join, but Tom denies him 3 times like Peter did. Soon after, Jim Casy is killed and his last words are, "You don' know what you're a-doin'." which is similar to Jesus's last words "Forgive them, Father, they know not what they do." Then the man who has killed Jim Casy stands over his body and says, "Jesus, George. I think you killed him." which is similar to when the Roman guards realize that Jesus is Jesus. Then Tom returns to the rest of the Joads and reports the horrific scene to Ma which can attributed to Peter and Mary coming together after Peter betrays Jesus 3 times. Lastly, one can see the resemblance of Jim Casy as Jesus Christ by his initials—J.C. 
Santiago of The Old Man and the Sea by Ernest Hemingway.
 Aslan in The Chronicles of Narnia by C. S. Lewis. Aslan the lion sacrifices himself to save Edmund but rises again from the dead to defeat the White Witch.
 Simon in William Golding's Lord of the Flies. When Simon reaches up and grabs the fruit from the top of the tree for the little boys in the group, which parallels the story of Jesus feeding the people on the mountain with fish and bread. Simon looks like Jesus, with long black hair. He also is spiritually sensitive. He likes to go off on his own (as Jesus did, going into the desert); he "wrestles with the devil" in the form of his conversation with the Lord of the Flies (the pig's head on a stick); he goes to the mountaintop to find out the revelation that the "beast" is only a dead pilot, and he is martyred for trying to bring the truth to the other boys. Finally, as Simon's dead body is taken by the sea, glowing creatures seem to form a halo around his head.
 Finny in A Separate Peace
 Billy Budd in Billy Budd by Herman Melville
 Queequeg in Moby Dick by Herman Melville
 John Coffey in The Green Mile.
Harry Potter in J. K. Rowling's Harry Potter series displays Savior qualities every time he defends the wizard (and Muggle) world from the devilish Lord Voldemort.  On multiple occasions, Harry willingly presents himself as a sacrifice and, by doing so, is able to destroy the evil wizard.  As an innocent baby, Harry becomes the only being to withstand the killing curse and temporarily defeats Voldemort. Later, after defeating Voldemort for the second time, Harry ultimately dies, as Christ did on the cross. In the end, however, as Christ resurrected, so does Harry Potter, who returns to ultimately destroy Voldemort.
Meursault in The Stranger.
Randle Patrick McMurphy in One Flew Over the Cuckoo's Nest.
Aragorn, a Ranger of the North and King of Gondor in The Lord of the Rings and Peter Jackson's The Lord of the Rings (film series). Aragorn represents the "kingship," nature of Christ. Like Christ, Aragorn too is the descendant of a long line of royalty who has been "exiled," or removed from his crown position. At the end of the series, Aragorn returns to Gondor and is named its official king. Along with Gandalf (sage/prophet) and Frodo Baggins (saviour/priest), Aragorn completes the triune representation of Christ in the series as its king.
Gandalf the wizard in the novel The Lord of the Rings and Peter Jackson's The Lord of the Rings (film series). In saving his companions from the Balrog, he falls into an abyss with it, battles with it, dies, and is restored to life by divine intervention. After his return, his robe is no longer gray but brilliant white.  The film emphasizes and brings out the symbolic aspects that Tolkien felt compelled to cut back in the book, and adds to the aspects of the sage/prophet and the resurrection aspect also the aspect of the exorcist by making explicit the nature of his healing of Théoden.
Frodo Baggins, a hobbit, also in The Lord of the Rings. His Christ imagery was more emphasized in the film series. Frodo carried a burden of evil on behalf of the whole world, which is the One Ring, like Christ who carried his cross for the sins of mankind. Frodo walks his "Via Dolorosa" to Mount Doom just like Jesus who made his way to Golgotha. As Frodo approaches the Cracks of Doom the Ring becomes a crushing weight as the cross was for Jesus. Samwise Gamgee, Frodo's friend, parallels Simon of Cyrene, who carries Frodo up to Mount Doom, much as Simon aids Jesus by picking up his cross to Golgotha. When Frodo accomplishes his mission, like Christ, he says "it is done". As Christ ascends to heaven, Frodo's life in Middle-earth comes to an end when he departs to the Undying Lands. Nevertheless, Tolkien makes sure not to present anything like a one-on-one parallel to Christ: Frodo is unmistakably presented as suffering from the effects of the Fall (in the sense of Catholic theology, in which it is not incompatible with being a genuinely friendly, not unheroic person of certain good-will), which does lead to a major false choice that has to be outdone by Providence; and he travels to the Undying Lands - an earthly Paradise, not Heaven - in order to find bodily healing and a possibly long, but finite life in peace.

Stage, television and film

 Babette in Babette's Feast. She gives entirely of her lottery winnings for the sake of a poor puritanical community.
 James Cole in Twelve Monkeys.
 In Hair, the character Claude becomes a classic Christ figure at various points in the script. In Act I, Claude enters, saying, "I am the Son of God. I shall vanish and be forgotten," then gives benediction to the tribe and the audience. Claude suffers from indecision, and, in his Gethsemane at the end of Act I, he asks "Where Do I Go?". There are various textual allusions to Claude being on a cross, and, in the end, he is chosen to give his life for the others.
 Klaatu in The Day the Earth Stood Still comes down from the "heavens" in a flying saucer, takes the name "Carpenter" to walk incognito among the people, and is persecuted and killed. However, he resurrects back to life, gives a stern benediction to the people of Earth, and then ascends back to the heavens.
 Neo in The Matrix Trilogy. Although the film series makes many visual and textual references to various religions, many Christ figure parallels exist. He is repeatedly called "the One" in a messianic sense; Neo saves various people (and all humanity at the trilogy's conclusion); he suffers and dies; he rises from the dead; and, in the ending of the first movie, ascends into the sky. "Neo" is also an anagram of "one".
 Superman in film. Both Superman and Jesus have been sent to Earth by their fathers (Jor-El and God, respectively). Recent film franchises, namely the 1978–2006 series and the DC Extended Universe, chronicle the beginning of Superman's story, with the first film including the famous quote: "They can be a great people, Kal-El, they wish to be. They only lack the light to show the way. For this reason, above all, their capacity for good, I have sent them you: my only son." 
In Superman: The Movie, Kal-El is sent to retire for 12 years to be educated "in spirit" by his father to be earth's savior. At the movie's ending, he made Lois Lane "Rise from death". 
In Superman Returns, Superman tells Lois "You wrote that the world doesn't need a savior," (referring to her article, "Why the World Doesn't Need Superman") "but every day, I hear people crying for one." Later in the movie, Superman is stabbed in the side as Jesus was believed to have been during the Crucifixion; after casting the Crystal Continent into space, the fatigued Superman falls to Earth in a pose almost identical to that of a man being crucified. Superman wakes from a coma in what seems the third day (by biblical timekeeping), mirroring Jesus' awakening on the third day after crucifixion.
The DCEU films Man of Steel and Batman v Superman: Dawn of Justice also display overt allusions between its iteration of Superman and Christ, including the cross pose, Clark saving several classmates from drowning at age 12, and Jor-El saying that Kal would become a "god" to Earth's inhabitants. Superman becomes a divisive figure in Batman v Superman as Jesus did prior to his crucifixion, and even dies saving the world from Doomsday in the film's climax before being brought back to life in Justice League and its director's cut.
 The T-800 in Terminator 2: Judgment Day is sent to save humanity, and tries to do so by sacrificing itself.
 Spock in Star Trek II: The Wrath of Khan exposes himself to a lethal amount of radiation in order to save the crew of the Enterprise, and is later "resurrected".
 Ellen Ripley in the Alien film series has been seen as a Christ figure. Both in the way that she serves as a personal savior to Newt in Aliens and in the matter that sacrifices her own life in Alien 3 (spreading her arms as she falls into a giant furnace) so the Alien cannot exist anymore. Others have noted that she dies in an act of self-sacrifice, yet similarly to Jesus, she returns in "another form" in the aptly titled Alien Resurrection.
 Jeremy Reed in Powder.
 Lucas Jackson in Cool Hand Luke.
 E.T. the Extra-Terrestrial.
 The Doctor in Doctor Who, "dying" in martyrdom and regenerating in a crucifix-esque position from time to time to save many worlds.
 Alex J. Murphy in the RoboCop films and other media. A policeman dead as a martyr in the line of duty resurrected to be a righteous champion and protector following faithfully his 3 "commandments": "Serve the public trust, protect the innocent, uphold the law".
 King Leonidas I in the historical-fantasy film 300 (2006), adapted from the graphic novel 300 by Frank Miller. At the movie's ending, Leonidas, along with the rest of his 300 Spartans, stay behind to defend a narrow pass against their vastly more numerable Persian foe. Despite suffering a gruesome death to arrow fire, Leonidas' death gives the rest of Sparta time to mobilize an army to defeat the Persian Empire. The final shots of the film show Leonidas' body laying in a crucifix-like pose, pierced in the side and hands by arrows.
 Walt Kowalski in Gran Torino. At the climax of the film, Kowalski lets himself get killed so that the Hmong-gang gets captured by the police. His dying posture even imitates the crucified Christ.

Comics and animation
In comic books as in all other media, Superman saves the people from dangers they cannot overcome on their own. The House of El (Jor-El, Kal-El, etc.) echoes the Hebrew expression for God, El. Jor-El sent his son, Kal-El to Earth to not just to save him from Krypton's impending doom but to become a God on Earth, to protect and save humanity from others and themselves. Jor-El also refers to Kal as "my son" or "the son"; he even once said, "They only need the light to show them the way. For this reason, and this reason only, I have sent you, my only son." We often see Superman in situations where he believes that he has to better humanity because he feels that he is the only one that can save humanity. Superman and society around him, sees him as someone to clean up the mess that humanity has made. They see him as a God because he is not one of them, they think that he is better than them. He even had to resurrect once to keep watching over Earth. For all intents and purposes, Superman is looked at as the modern-day, comic book Jesus Christ sent to save Earth before we destroy ourselves in chaos.
 Nausicaä, the protagonist of Hayao Miyazaki's manga Nausicaä of the Valley of the Wind and its film adaptation, is the humane and peace-loving Warrior Princess of the Valley of the Wind, a small post-apocalyptic society in a world dominated by large, powerful insects who reside in the "Sea of Corruption". Fueled by her love for others and for life itself, Nausicaä attempts to restore the balance of life among other human tribes and the insects, often making numerous sacrifices to do so. Although her character was intended to be viewed in the context of animistic philosophies by Miyazaki, she is often interpreted, especially in regards to Disney's English dub, as a Christ figure.
 Kamui Shiro in the manga series X. The story takes place at the end of days. Kamui Shirō returns home to Tokyo after a six-year absence to face his destiny as the one who will determine humanity's fate. The construction of Kamui as a messiah is reinforced by his miraculous birth and given name. "Kamui" (a spiritual or divine being in Ainu mythology), like "Christ", doubles as a title that alludes to the character's divine nature.
 Kikyo, in Inuyasha, is able to perform miracles. Resurrected, she eventually gives up on her love for the main character and dies for the cause which allows the other characters to eliminate the antagonist. See Inuyasha: The Final Act "Among the Twinkling Stars"

References

External links
 
 The Journal of Religion and Film - An examination of the description, critique, and embodiment of religion in film.

Heroes
Language and mysticism
Cultural depictions of Jesus